The Golden Needle Sewing School was an underground school for women in Herat, Afghanistan, during the rule of the Taliban. Because women were not allowed to be educated under the strict interpretation of Islamic law introduced by the Taliban, women writers belonging to the Herat Literary Circle set up a group called the Sewing Circles of Herat, which founded the Golden Needle Sewing School in or around 1996.

Women would visit the school three times a week, ostensibly to sew, but would instead hear lectures given by professors of literature from Herat University. Children playing outside would alert the group if the religious police approached, giving them time to hide their books and pick up sewing equipment. Herat may have been the most oppressed area under the Taliban, according to Christina Lamb, author of The Sewing Circles of Herat, because it was a cultured city and mostly Shi'a, both of which the Taliban opposed. She told Radio Free Europe:

See also
 Islamic feminism
 Islamic Emirate of Afghanistan
 Revolutionary Association of the Women of Afghanistan
 Sewing circle
 Sharia
 Taliban treatment of women
 Women in Islam

Notes

Further reading

 Lamb, Christina. The Sewing Circles of Herat. HarperCollins, 2004.
 The Revolutionary Association of Women of Afghanistan, accessed 29 July 2010.

Educational organisations based in Afghanistan
Women's rights in Islam
Women's rights in Afghanistan
Women-only spaces
History of women in Afghanistan
1996 in Afghanistan
1996 in women's history